Tanel is a male given name of Estonian origin. It is a cognate of the name Daniel. Individuals bearing the name Tanel include:  
Tanel Ingi (born 1976), Estonian actor
Tanel Joamets (born 1968), Estonian pianist
Tanel Kangert (born 1987), Estonian road bicycle racer
Tanel Kiik (born 1989), Estonian politician
Tanel Kurbas (born 1988), Estonian professional basketball player
Tanel Laanmäe (born 1989), Estonian javelin thrower
Tanel Leok (born 1985), Estonian motocross racer
Tanel Padar (born 1980), Estonian singer
Tanel Rander (born 1980), Estonian artist, curator and writer 
Tanel Sokk (born 1985), Estonian professional basketball player
Tanel Talve (born 1976), iEstonian journalist, radio and television presenter and politician
Tanel Tammet (born 1965), Estonian computer scientist, professor, software engineer and politician
Tanel Tein (born 1978), Estonian professional basketball player
Tanel Toom (born 1982), Estonian Oscar nominated director, screenwriter
Tanel Tuhal (born 1967), Estonian architect
Tanel Veenre (born 1977), Estonian jewellery artist and designer

References

Estonian masculine given names